Pirdeh or Pir Deh may refer to:

Pir Deh, Gilan
Pir Deh, Shaft, Gilan Province
Pirdeh, Tehran